The 1994 Commonwealth Final was the eleventh running of the Commonwealth Final as part of the qualification for the 1994 Speedway World Championship. The 1994 Final was run on 22 May at the Norfolk Arena in King's Lynn, England, and was part of the World Championship qualifying for riders from the Commonwealth nations.

Riders qualified for the Final from the Australian, British and New Zealand Championships.

1994 was the last time the Commonwealth Final was run following the introduction of the Speedway Grand Prix in 1995.

1994 Commonwealth Final
22 May
 King's Lynn, Norfolk Arena
Qualification: Top 10 plus 1 reserve to the Overseas Final in Coventry, England

Classification

References

See also
 Motorcycle Speedway

1994
World Individual
Commonwealth Final
1994 in British motorsport
May 1994 sports events in the United Kingdom